Various Proto-Uralic homeland hypotheses on the origin of the Uralic languages and the location (Urheimat or homeland) and period in which the Proto-Uralic language was spoken, have been advocated over the years.

Homeland hypotheses

Europe versus Siberia 
It has been suggested that the Proto-Uralic homeland was located near the Ural Mountains, either on the European or the Siberian side. The main reason to suppose that there was a Siberian homeland has been the traditional taxonomic model that sees the Samoyedic branch as splitting off first. Because the present border between the Samoyedic and the Ugric branch is in Western Siberia, the original split was seen to have occurred there too.

However, because the Ugric languages are known to have been spoken earlier on the European side of the Urals, a European homeland would be equally possible. In recent years, it has also been argued on the basis of phonology that the oldest split was not between the Samoyedic and the Finno-Ugric but between the Finno-Permic and the Ugro-Samoyedic language groups. The lexical level is argued to be less reliable, and lexical innovativeness (a small number of shared cognates) can be confused because of the great age of the division. For a long time, no new arguments for a Siberian homeland have been presented.

Both European and Siberian homeland proposals have been supported by palaeolinguistic evidence, but only those cases in which the semantic reconstructions are certain are valid. A Siberian homeland has been claimed on the basis of two coniferous tree names in Proto-Uralic, but the trees (Abies sibirica and Pinus cembra) have for a long time been present also in the far east of Europe. A European homeland is supported by words for 'bee', 'honey', 'elm' etc. They can be reconstructed already to Proto-Uralic, if Samoyedic is no longer seen as the first branch to split off.

More recently, loanword evidence has also been used to support a European homeland. Proto-Uralic has been seen as borrowing words from Proto-Indo-European, and the Proto-Indo-European homeland has rarely been located east of the Urals. Proto-Uralic even seems to have developed in close contact with Proto-Indo-Iranian, which is seen as having arisen in the Poltavka culture of the Caspian steppes before its spread to Asia.

The Lyalovo culture (ca. 5000–3650 BC) has been equated with the Proto-Uralic urheimat, and the following Volosovo culture (ca. 3650–1900 BC) with the Proto-Finno-Ugric urheimat. Some scholars believe that the culture of Lyalovo was in fact the Proto-Uralic urheimat and that its inhabitants spread Uralic languages to north-eastern Europe.<ref>Parpola, Asko & Carpelan, Christian: The Cultural Counterparts to Proto-Indo-European, Proto-Uralic and Proto-Aryan - Matching the dispersal and contact patterns in the linguistic and archaeological record, pp. 107–141, 2005</ref> The Volosovo culture has been named the Bronze Age Successor Culture, a textile-ceramic culture that developed in the region between Upper Volga and lakes Ladoga and Onega. It was distinguished from other groups based on the traces of textile used for the production of ceramics, and spread southeast all the way to central Volga, south to the entire river valley of the Oka, southwest to the northern shore of the Daugava, and northwest of Fennoscandia to Karelia, Finland and northern Sweden and Norway. Known as the Seima-Turbino phenomenon, it was a culturally unified, extensive network of trade in copper and bronze. The traces of the Seima-Turbino phenomenon are found in a wide area that begins in Sweden and ends in the Altai Mountains.Nordqvist, Kerkko & Herva, Vesa-Pekka & Ikäheimo, Janne & Lahelma, Antti: Early Copper Use in Neolithic North-Eastern Europe: An Overview. Estonian Journal of Archeology, 2012, 16th ed., No. 1, pp. 3–25. Tallinn, Tartu, Estonia: Estonian Academy of Sciences.

However, Jaakko Häkkinen argues that the language of the Volosovo culture was not itself Uralic, but a Paleo-European substratum to Uralic, especially its westernmost branches, and identifies Proto-Uralic with the Garino-Bor culture instead.

The Volosovo region was invaded by the Abashevo cultural groups at about 2300 BC. The latter buried their deceased in kurgans, and they are thought to have spoken a form of Indo-European ancestral to the Indo-Iranian languages and to have influenced the Volosovian vocabulary by introducing Aryan (Indo-Iranian) loan words. The Abashevo contributed to the fact that livestock farming and small-scale farming began to be practiced in the southern parts of the forest zone of Taiga.Antony, David W.: The Horse, The Wheel, and Language: The Bronze-Age Riders from the Eurasian Steppes Shaped the Modern World. New Jersey, USA: Princeton University Press, 2010.

It has been hypothesized that Pre-Proto-Uralic was spoken in Asia, on the basis of typological similarity with the Altaic Sprachbund and hypothetical early contacts with the Yukaghir languages. Aikio (2014) agrees with Häkkinen (2012) that Uralic–Yukaghir is unsupported and implausible, and that common vocabulary shared by the two families is best explained as the result of borrowing from Uralic into Yukaghir. However, Aikio (2014) puts the date of borrowing much later, arguing that the loanwords he accepts as valid were borrowed from an early stage of Samoyedic (preceding Proto-Samoyedic; thus roughly in the 1st millennium BC) into Yukaghir, in the same general region between the Yenisei River and Lake Baikal.

Continuity theories

Archaeological continuity has long been used as the basis of an argument for linguistic continuity. The argument was advanced by Estonians Paul Ariste and Harri Moora in 1956. Just as long, this kind of argumentation has also been heavily criticised. The oldest version of the continuity theory can be called the moderate or shallow continuity theory. It claims that linguistic continuity in Estonia and Finland can be traced back to the arrival of Typical Combed Ware, about 6,000 years ago. This view became mainstream in the multidisciplinary Tvärminne symposium in 1980. At the time, there seemed to be no serious linguistic results to contradict this archaeological view.

The continuity argumentation in the Uralic studies gained greater visibility in the 1990s, when the next step of the continuity theory was popularised (even though this line of reasoning had occasionally received airing). In the radical or deep continuity theory, it is claimed that the linguistic continuity in Finland could be traced back to the Mesolithic initial colonization, beyond 10,000 years.Wiik, Kalevi 2002: Eurooppalaisten juuret. Jyväskylä: Atena.

However, in Indo-European studies, J. P. Mallory had already thoroughly scrutinized the methodological weaknesses of the continuity argumentation in 1989. In Uralic studies, it was also soon noted that the same argument (archaeological continuity) was used to support contradicting views, which revealed the method's unreliability.Aikio, Ante & Aikio, Aslak 2001: Heimovaelluksista jatkuvuuteen. Suomalaisen väestöhistorian tutkimuksen pirstoutuminen. – Muinaistutkija 4/2001, p. 2–21. Helsinki: Suomen arkeologinen seura. Häkkinen, Jaakko 2010: Jatkuvuusperustelut ja saamelaisen kielen leviäminen (OSA 1). – Muinaistutkija 1 / 2010, p. 19–36. http://www.alkuperasivusto.fi/Jatkuvuus1.pdf

At the same time, new linguistic results appeared to contradict the continuity theories: the datings of Proto-SaamiAikio, Ante 2006: On Germanic-Saami contacts and Saami prehistory. – Suomalais-Ugrilaisen Seuran Aikakauskirja 91, p. 9–55. Helsinki: Suomalais-Ugrilainen Seura. http://www.sgr.fi/susa/91/aikio.pdf and Proto-Finnic and of Proto-Uralic (Kallio 2006; Häkkinen 2009)Kallio, Petri 2006: Suomen kantakielten absoluuttista kronologiaa. – Virittäjä 1 / 2006, p. 2–25.
http://www.kotikielenseura.fi/virittaja/hakemistot/jutut/2006_2.pdf are both clearly younger than it was thought in the framework of the continuity theories.

Nowadays linguists rarely believe in the continuity theories because of their shown methodological flaws and their incompatibility with the new linguistic results, but some archaeologists and laymen may still advance such arguments.

Modern view

In the 21st century, linguistic arguments have placed the Proto-Uralic homeland possibly around the Kama River or, more generally, close to the Great Volga Bend and the Ural Mountains, although Petri Kallio, while agreeing with the placement of the homeland in Central Russia, prefers the Volga-Oka region further to the west. The expansion of Proto-Uralic has been dated to about 2000 BC (4000 years ago), and its earlier stages go back at least one or two millennia earlier. Either way, this is considerably later than the earlier views of the continuity theories, which would place Proto-Uralic deep into Europe.

Juha Janhunen suggests a homeland in eastern or central Siberia, somewhere between the Ob and Yenisei river or near the Sayan mountains in the Russian–Mongolian border region.

In 2022, a group of scholars have presented evidence that the Proto-Uralic Homeland was located somewhere in Western Siberia and spoken by hunter-gatherers, later spreading along rivers into the Volga region, and subsequently expanding westwards and eastwards. The spread of Uralic languages may be in part due to the Seima-Turbino phenomenon, although no direct link between them can be made. Cultural technology of proto-Uralic can be described as "Neolithic", as it included pottery but no vocabulary for food production. They note that Uralic and Indo-European were ultimately not related to each other, and that "whether based on cognacy or loans the argument from lexical resemblances is flawed". Many cognates may be explained by later contact with the Indo-Iranian branch of Indo-European. They also found that the vocabulary of the Samoyedic branch is often quite "un-Uralic" which may point to a substratum among Samoyedic, although they did not found conclusive evidence for borrowings from an unknown language. Lastly they noted that "a number of typological properties are eastern-looking overall, fitting comfortably into northeast Asia, Siberia, or the North Pacific Rim". Overall, Uralic languages share deep similarities with the "Northern Pacific Rim linguistic area", which broadly includes various Paleosiberian languages, as well as various language families in Northern America, but also show similarities to the "Northeast Asian linguistic area" (also known as Altaic areal grouping), pointing to later contact between proto-Uralic and Northeast Asian groups.

According to Bjørn Rasmus G., the Proto-Uralic speakers may be associated with the Okunev culture in the Altai region. Proto-Uralic, according to Rasmus G. Bjørn, stood in areal contact with the Proto-Turkic language, and both later with Indo-European languages (specifically Tocharian and Iranian languages).

Evidence from population genetics
Vladimir Napolskikh, who studied the origins of the "earth-diver" creation myths, has concluded that a certain variety of those myths, which is found in the folklore of Uralic-speaking peoples and other N1, C3, and Q (Y-DNA) carrying populations, originated in western Siberia.

Genetic data suggests that Uralic-speakers can be associated with "Western Siberian hunter-gatherers" (short WSHG). Western Siberian hunter-gatherers formed from both a Paleolithic Siberian population, known as Ancient North Eurasians (short ANE), as well as from "Eastern Siberians", samplified by Evenks or Evens. The calculated date of admixture is inferred to be ~7–9 kya. Based on these findings, tests on the modern Mansi people revealed that they could be modeled as ~43% Eastern Siberian (Evenk or Even) and ~57% ANE.

A 2019 study found a Siberian gene flow into the Eastern Baltic region, possibly connected to the spread of Uralic speakers.

Proto-Uralic speakers may be associated with the Okunev culture, which was a Scytho-Siberian forest culture in the Altai-Sayan region, characterized by high genetic affinity to the Botai culture in Northern Central Asia and the ancient Tarim mummies in modern day Xinjiang, as well as Western Siberian hunter-gatherers (WSHG). Their "eastern" genetic affinities may be explained by contact with proto-Turkic peoples. The arrival of the Indo-European Afanasievo culture may have caused the dispersal of proto-Uralic languages along the Seima-Turbino cultural area.

See also
Proto-Uralic language
Uralic languages
Finno-Ugric languages
Samoyedic languages

References

Further reading
 
 Parpola, A. (2013). "Formation of the Indo-European and Uralic (Finno-Ugric) language families in the light of archaeology". In: Grünthal, R. & Kallio, P. (Eds.). A linguistic map of prehistoric northern Europe''. Suomalais-Ugrilainen Seura, 2013. pp. 119-184.
 Parpola, Asko (2022). "LOCATION OF THE URALIC PROTO-LANGUAGE IN THE KAMA RIVER VALLEY AND THE URALIC SPEAKERS' EXPANSION EAST AND WEST WITH THE 'SEJMA-TURBINO TRANSCULTURAL PHENOMENON’ 2200-1900 BC". In: Археология евразийских степей, (2), 258-277. URL: https://cyberleninka.ru/article/n/location-of-the-uralic-proto-language-in-the-kama-river-valley-and-the-uralic-speakers-expansion-east-and-west-with-the-sejma (дата обращения: 08.11.2022).

Uralic languages
Urheimat